Paul Sulc (born 1 February 1967) is an Australian politician. He was a Labor Party member of the Western Australian Legislative Council from December 1996 to May 1997, representing East Metropolitan Region.

Born in Perth, Western Australia, Sulc was a refrigeration fitter before entering politics. He was an unsuccessful candidate for the Legislative Council at the 1993 state election, but was elected on a countback following the resignation of Alannah MacTiernan to contest a seat in the Legislative Assembly at the 1996 state election. Sulc was an unsuccessful candidate at the 1996 election; as such, his term expired with the Legislative Council on 21 May 1997.

References

1967 births
Living people
Members of the Western Australian Legislative Council
Australian Labor Party members of the Parliament of Western Australia